The Battle of Guastalla or Battle of Luzzara was a battle fought on 19 September 1734 between Franco-Sardinian   and Austrian (Habsburg) troops as part of the War of the Polish Succession.

Background 

Following the death in February 1733 of King Augustus II of Poland, European powers exerted diplomatic and military influence in the selection of his successor. Competing elections in August and October 1733 elected Stanisław Leszczyński and Frederick August, Elector of Saxony to be the next king. Stanisław was supported primarily by France, while Frederick August was supported by Russia and the Habsburg Emperor Charles VI. On October 10, France declared war on Austria and Saxony to draw military strength away from Poland, and shortly thereafter invaded both the Rhineland and the Habsburg territories in what is now northern Italy. The Italian campaign was conducted in conjunction with King Charles Emmanuel III of Sardinia, to whom France had promised the Duchy of Milan in the Treaty of Turin, signed in September 1733.

The Franco-Sardinian allies marched on Milan in October 1733, and occupied Lombardy without significant losses. In the spring of 1734 the Austrians responded in force, but suffered a bloody defeat in the Battle of San Pietro, won by the French under de Coigny and de Broglie. Following the victory, reluctance on the part of Charles Emmanuel to pursue the retreating Austrians led to relatively little action throughout the summer of 1734. In September Field Marshal Dominik von Königsegg-Rothenfels, who replaced Florimund Mercy (killed at San Pietro), renewed the Austrian offensive, winning  a small victory near Quistello when his troops successfully raided de Broglio's headquarters on 14 September, taking 1,500 prisoners and capturing Charles Emmanuel's silver service and campaign warchest. As the Austrians pursued the allies, they surrounded additional pockets of soldiers, taking another 3,000 prisoners. The allies fell back toward Guastalla, where they fortified a position between the Crostolo and Po rivers.

After pausing to reprovision on 16 September, Königsegg continued the pursuit, reaching Luzzara on 18 September. The allied leadership that evening decided to force a battle at Guastalla as revenge for the action at Quistello.

Battle lines 
The area between Guastalla and Luzzara included two small dams, and numerous other landworks, including hedges and low stone walls, that were useful as cover for defending troops. To the west of Guastalla was a plain dotted with copses of trees, extending to the Po, where the allies had a boat-bridge to facilitate the movement of troops across the river. Between the bridgehead and the fortified town of Guastalla they erected a series of defensive works between the two dams, anchored by a large redoubt about halfway between the town and the bridge. The allied line extended from the village of Pieve, south of Guastalla, around to the east and north of the town, ending with battalions of cavalry on the plains in front of the defensive line between the town and the bridge. Overall command was given to Charles Emmanuel, who led the center, with de Coigny leading the right flank and de Broglie the left. On the morning of 19 September Charles Emmanuel sent three regiments across the Po to guard against possible Austrian flanking maneuvers that could bypass his army and gain access to Milanese territory. Demonstrations by Austrian troops on the left bank of the Po on 18 September reinforced his concern over this possibility.

When Königsegg learned of this latter movement, he decided the time had come to attack the allied position at Guastalla, hoping for a decisive defeat, forcing the allies to retreat either across the Po or the Crostolo. Because he had been unable to personally reconnoiter the enemy position, and reports indicated no significant massings of enemy troops (which were largely concealed behind the numerous structures along the line of defense), Königsegg eventually concluded that the bulk of the allied troops had been withdrawn across the Po. Hoping to isolate the remaining enemy troops, he directed the bulk of his forces toward the bridgehead on the allied left.

Battle 
Königsegg ordered the first companies to move out early on 19 September, without explicitly telling the commanding generals that battle was to be expected. When the leading edges of his army reached the allied positions, reconnaissance indicated that there were as few as 5,000 infantry in the field, and that the enemy's cavalry appeared to be in retreat. Convinced that he was facing the rear guard of the allied army, Königsegg ordered a single line of troops forward at about 10 am to flush out the defenders. While this met with limited success, he was forced to commit more resources to the battle as it picked up in intensity about 11 am. Around noon Charles Emmanuel directed troops from the allied right to come around to assist in the defense of the left flank, where a large portion of the Austrian army was engaged in between the two dams. About 1 pm Königsegg's second, Prince Frederick Louis of Württemberg-Winnental was killed while leading a cavalry charge.

While the battle waged incessantly, Austrian grenadiers came up the river by boat and landed just behind the allied cavalry position. In response, Charles Emmanuel ordered the left flank to retreat toward the bridgehead, and called on most of the remaining troops from the right for support. Some troops from the right flank marched to the aid of the center without orders to do so, which ultimately helped the center hold when Königsegg threw his reserves into the battle there around 2 pm.

The battle continued, with neither side able to gain ground against the other, and without further reserves to bring in, until about 4 pm. By that time, both sides were running low on ammunition, and Königsegg ordered the Austrians to withdraw back to Luzzara.

Aftermath 

While the allies held the field of battle, both sides suffered significant casualties. The Austrians lost three generals (include Prince Frederick), the allies four. Austrian killed and wounded amounted to 4,800, and more than 1,600 horses were killed. The allies lost 1,600 killed and about 4,000 wounded.

Charles Emmanuel and the French commanders, after receiving some reinforcements, considered attacking Austrian positions erected on the north bank of the Po in the following days, but reconnaissance reports indicated that the positions were likely unassailable. Königsegg returned to Mantua, where he ordered troops defending the city and Tyrol numbering 4,000 to join his army, which had been reduced to just 16,000 effectives. While the allies did make an attempt to capture Mirandola in October, Königsegg was able to rally 10,000 troops to break up the siege attempt.

Following the allied gains of 1733, the two sides had, between this battle and that at San Pietro, killed or wounded about 12,000 men, and the 1734 campaign ended about where it began. Marshal de Broglie observed that if the battle had not been fought, the world would have been the winner.

References

External links 

 History of the house of Austria, Volume 3, William Coxe (1889)
 Martin's history of France: The decline of the French monarchy, Volume 1, Henri Martin, translated by Mary Louise Booth (1866)
 1-72860 Guastalla 1734. Una battaglia per il trono di Polonia. 2003 by Santangelo, Andrea, ITALY, VERBA MARTIS
 Guido Burani's Website, La Battaglia di Guastalla (in Italian)

Guastalla
Guastalla
Guastalla
Conflicts in 1734
1734 in the Holy Roman Empire
Guastalla
1734 in Italy